Trema is a genus of about 15 species of evergreen trees closely related to the hackberries (Celtis), occurring in subtropical and tropical regions of southern Asia, northern Australasia, Africa, South and Central America, and parts of North America.

Taxonomy
Previously included either in the elm family, Ulmaceae, or with Celtis in the Celtidaceae, genetic analysis has shown the Celtidaceae are best placed in the hemp family, Cannabaceae.

Description
The fruit is a small drupe  in diameter.

Species associations
Trema species are sometimes used as food plants by the larvae of hepialid moths of the genera Aenetus, including A. splendens, which burrow horizontally into the trunk then vertically down, and Endoclita, including E. malabaricus.

Some Trema species unusually able to live in symbiosis with rhizobia for nitrogen fixation as a non-legume. In this case it is customary to mention these species as a separate genus Parasponia.

Uses
Trema orientalis is widely planted for land reclamation in southern Asia, valued for its tolerance of poor soils due to its ability to fix nitrogen. It is also an invasive species on some Pacific Ocean islands.

Species
Trema comprises the following species:

 Trema affinis (Planch.) Blume
 Trema amboinensis (Willd.) Blume
 Trema andersonii (Planch.) Byng & Christenh.
 Trema angustifolium (Planch.) Blume
 Trema asperum (Brongn.) Blume
 Trema cannabina Lour. – Lesser trema
 Trema cubense Urb.
 Trema discolor (Brongniart) Blume
 Trema domingense Urb.
 Trema eurhynchum (Miq.) Byng & Christenh.
 Trema integerrima (Beurl.) Standl.
 Trema lamarckianum (Roem. & Schult.) Blume – West Indian trema, Lamarck's trema
 Trema levigatum Hand.-Mazz.
 Trema melastomatifolium (J.J.Sm.) Byng & Christenh.
 Trema micranthum (L.) Blume – Jamaican nettle tree
 Trema nitidum C.J. Chen
 Trema orientale (L.) Blume – Pigeon wood
 Trema parviflorum (Miq.) Byng & Christenh.
 Trema politorium (Planch.) Blume
 Trema simulans (Merr. & L.M.Perry) Byng & Christenh.
 Trema tomentosum (Roxb.) H.Hara – Poison peach
 var. tomentosum (Roxb.) H.Hara
 var. viridis (Planch.) Hewson – eastern Australia
 Trema vieillardii (Planch.) Schltr.

Species names with uncertain taxonomic status
The status of the following species is unresolved:

 Parasponia paucinervia Merr. & L.M.Perry
 Parasponia rugosa Blume
 Parasponia similis Blume
 Trema acuminatissima Boerl.
 Trema argentea Blume
 Trema blancoi Blume
 Trema bracteolata Blume
 Trema burmanni Blume
 Trema carinata Blume
 Trema crassifolia Liebm.
 Trema glabrescens Blume
 Trema glomerata Blume
 Trema griffithii Blume
 Trema guinensis Priemer
 Trema humbertii J.-F.Leroy
 Trema imbricata Blume
 Trema integrifolia Baill.
 Trema integrifolia Hosok.
 Trema lancifolia  Ridl.
 Trema malaccensis Gand.
 Trema morifolia Blume
 Trema pallida Blume
 Trema philippinensis Elmer
 Trema pubigera Blume
 Trema rigida Blume
 Trema rugosa Blume
 Trema scaberrima Blume
 Trema sieberi Blume
 Trema strigilosa Lundell
 Trema strigosa Blume
 Trema viridis Blume
 Trema vulcanica Merr.

References

External links

Pacific Island Ecosystems at Risk (PIER) page on Trema orientalis (with photos)

 
Rosales genera